The Servants is a young adult contemporary fantasy novel by British author Michael Marshall Smith, writing under the name M. M. Smith. It tells the story of an eleven-year-old boy named Mark who, against his wishes, moves away from his home town of London to the wintry Brighton seaside, and the resulting misadventures.  It was nominated in 2008 for a World Fantasy Award in the Best Novel category.

References

2008 British novels
British fantasy novels
Young adult fantasy novels
British young adult novels
Novels set in Brighton
HarperCollins books